The 2009 Danish Individual Speedway Championship was the 2009 edition of the Danish Individual Speedway Championship. The final was staged over two rounds, at Vojens and Fjelsted, and was won by Nicki Pedersen. It was Pedersen's sixth national title, taking him level with Hans Nielsen in second place on the all-time list.

Event format 
The competition started with two quarter finals, with four progressing to the semi-final from each. The top six then officially qualified from the semi-final, joining nine seeded riders and a wild card in the final series. The final series was held over two rounds, with the top four scorers from the two rounds then competing in a Grand Final. The points from the Grand Final were then added to the total score and the overall winner was the rider with the most total points.

Quarter finals

Semi-final

Final series

Final classification

References 

Denmark